Isu is a Grassfields Bantu language of Cameroon.

Writing system

References

Ring languages
Languages of Cameroon